The 2021 FC Zhetysu season was the club's fourth season back in the Kazakhstan Premier League following their relegation at the end of the 2016 season, and 24th season in total.

Season Events
On 10 March, Zhetysu had three points deducted as a punishment for the unavailability of their nominated reserve stadium for their second match-day fixture.

Squad

Transfers

In

Out

Released

Competitions

Overview

Premier League

Results summary

Results by round

Results

League table

Kazakhstan Cup

Group stage

Squad statistics

Appearances and goals

|-
|colspan="16"|Players away from Zhetysu on loan:
|-
|colspan="16"|Players who left Zhetysu during the season:

|}

Goal scorers

Clean sheets

Disciplinary record

References

FC Zhetysu seasons
Zhetysu